Honeymoon is a 1974 Indian Malayalam film, directed by A. B. Raj and produced by K. P. Kottarakkara. The film stars Prem Nazir, Jose Prakash, Sankaradi and Alummoodan in the lead roles. The film had musical score by M. K. Arjunan.

Cast 
Prem Nazir
Jose Prakash
Sankaradi
Alummoodan
K. R. Vijaya
Meena
Sudheer
Sumithra
Usharani

Soundtrack 
The music was composed by M. K. Arjunan and the lyrics were written by Sreekumaran Thampi.

References

External links 
 

1974 films
1970s Malayalam-language films
Films directed by A. B. Raj